

181001–181100 

|-id=043
| 181043 Anan || 2005 PV || Anan, a city which located in eastern Shikoku Island, Japan || 
|}

181101–181200 

|-id=136
| 181136 Losonczrita ||  || Rita Losoncz (born 1985), the fiancée of Krisztián Vida who participated with many observations in the minor planet survey at the Konkoly Observatory in Budapest, Hungary || 
|}

181201–181300 

|-id=241
| 181241 Dipasquale ||  || Pietro Di Pasquale (born 1947), a cardiologist at the hospital in Palermo city || 
|-id=249
| 181249 Tkachenko ||  || Viktor Tkachenko (born 1953), former director of the Kyiv Palace of Sports || 
|-id=279
| 181279 Iapyx ||  || Iapyx from Greek mythology. He was the son of Iasus and favourite of Apollo, the healer of Aeneas during the Trojan War, and mythological founder of Apulia. || 
|-id=298
| 181298 Ladányi || 2006 QY || Tamás Ladányi (born 1972), a Hungarian amateur astronomer and a member of "The World At Night" group. || 
|}

181301–181400 

|-bgcolor=#f2f2f2
| colspan=4 align=center | 
|}

181401–181500 

|-id=419
| 181419 Dragonera ||  || Sa Dragonera, a small island in the Balearic Islands, 3.2 km long and 500 meters high. || 
|-id=483
| 181483 Ampleforth ||  || Ampleforth, England, home to the Benedictine community of Ampleforth Abbey, to Ampleforth College where the discoverer was educated, and to the churchyard of Our Lady and St. Benedict's where his stepfather is buried || 
|}

181501–181600 

|-id=518
| 181518 Ursulakleguin ||  || Ursula Kroeber Le Guin (1929–2018), an American novelist and the author of many books and stories for adults and children. Recipient of numerous literary awards, Le Guin's words will be remembered, worlds will be visited, and characters beloved, for as long as her namesake orbits the Sun. || 
|-id=562
| 181562 Paulrosendall ||  || Paul E. Rosendall (born 1984), a senior software engineer at the Johns Hopkins University Applied Physics Laboratory, who served as the Lead for Software Fault Protection for the New Horizons mission to Pluto. || 
|-id=569
| 181569 Leetyphoon ||  || Typhoon Lee (born 1948), an isotope geochemist and nuclear astrophysicist who is a member of Taiwan's Academia Sinica || 
|}

181601–181700 

|-id=627
| 181627 Philgeluck ||  || Philippe Geluck (born 1954), a Belgian comedian, humorist and cartoonist, creator of the comic strip Le Chat || 
|-id=661
| 181661 Alessandro ||  || Alessandro Foglia (born 1968) is the brother of one of the discoverers. He is a financial manager and a leader of the local Astronomy Club and he has introduced astronomy to young people. || 
|-id=670
| 181670 Kengyun ||  || KengYun (1924–2000), a master of Zen, who taught others how to understand themselves, and to recognize the laws of universe and reality. He helped others accomplish their completeness and human evolution toward the bliss of lives. || 
|}

181701–181800 

|-id=702
| 181702 Forcalquier ||  || Forcalquier, a community in southeastern France. It is located on the foot of the Luberon mountain ranges in the Alpes-de Haute Provence department. || 
|-id=751
| 181751 Phaenops ||  || Phaenops from Greek mythology. After hearing that Diomedes had killed both of his sons, Xanthos (Xanthus) and Thouon (Thoön), he was left in bitter grief and anguish. || 
|}

181801–181900 

|-id=824
| 181824 Königsleiten ||  || Königsleiten, an Austrian village in the province of Salzburg and part of Wald im Pinzgau || 
|-id=829
| 181829 Houyunde ||  || Hou Yunde (born 1929) laid the foundation for modern infectious disease prevention and control technology systems in China. He is an Academician of the Chinese Academy of Engineering. The medical drugs he developed have cured millions of patients. He won the 2017 State Preeminent Science and Technology Award of China. || 
|-id=872
| 181872 Cathaysa ||  || Cathaysa was the name of a Guanche aboriginal girl who lived in Tenerife and was sold in Valencia as a slave in 1494, as well as the daughter (born 2005) of the Spanish astronomer David Martinez-Delgado. This name recognizes the Canary Islands' contribution to astronomy. || 
|}

181901–182000 

|-bgcolor=#f2f2f2
| colspan=4 align=center | 
|}

References 

181001-182000